Rameswaram railway station is a railway terminus serving the town of Rameswaram located on the Rameswaram Island in the Ramanathapuram district of Tamil Nadu. It belongs to the Madurai railway division and is an important terminal of the Southern Railway zone. The station links the pilgrim town as well as the rest of the island to the mainland via the highly acclaimed Pamban Rail Bridge.

Location and layout 
The station is one of the oldest in the country, and accommodate trains such as the Sethu Express and the Boatmail Express, which were two of the most significant and historic trains operated in the region prior to the gauge conversion. There are four platforms, seven railway tracks, and two pitlines within the station. Currently, the Rameswaram railway station and the Pamban railway station are the only two functioning train stations in the island excluding the former rail terminus in Dhanushkodi that is no longer in use. The metre-gauge branch line from Pamban Junction to Dhanushkodi was dismantled after it was destroyed in a cyclone in 1964.

Source station 
Since it is the last railway station on Manamadurai Rameswaram Branch Line, it acts as a source station for all trains which are operated from here. They include:

 Boatmail Express
 Sethu super fast Express
 Rameswaram Coimbatore weekly Express
 Rameswaram Kanyakumari (cape) tri-weekly express
 Rameswaram Tirupathi tri-weekly Express
 Rameswaram okha weekly Express
 Rameswaram Bhuvaneswaram weekly Express
 Rameswaram Banaras weekly Express
 Rameswaram Ayodhya weekly Express
 Rameswaram Ajmer Humsafar Express (weekly)
 Rameswaram Madurai Passenger
 Rameswaram tiruchirappalli passenger

Timetable

References

External links 
 

Railway stations in Ramanathapuram district
Madurai railway division
Rameswaram
Railway terminus in India
Transport in Rameswaram